Frederick Viner (5 March 1858 – August 1940) was an English watercolour artist.

Frederick Viner, known as Fred, was born in Mortlake, Surrey, a twin son of William Viner and Jane Whiting.

From 1873 he was a seaman and in 1876 he signed up for ten years service in the Royal Navy but was discharged in 1878. On the 1881 Census he is recorded in Canterbury Prison as a mariner serving 15 months 'hard labour' for housebreaking.

By the time of the 1901 Census he had returned to live in Mortlake, where he made his living as a watercolour artist painting local scenes, mostly of Richmond, Kew and Isleworth, but also seascapes and other locations. His paintings are signed F.Viner. In 1939 he was at the Grove Road Institution, Richmond; he died in 1940 and is buried in Richmond Cemetery.

Some of his paintings are in the Richmond Borough Art Collection at Orleans House, the Richmond Local Studies collection and in the Hounslow archives.

References

External links
 Works by F Viner Richmond Borough Art Collection
 Watercolour by Viner, F Richmond Local Studies Collection

1858 births
1940 deaths
People from Richmond, London
English watercolourists
Burials at Richmond Cemetery